The 2013 Dr McKenna Cup was a Gaelic football competition played under the auspices of Ulster GAA. The tournament features the 2012 All-Ireland Champions, Donegal, whose first game (away against Fermanagh) was put back for several days due to Donegal's team holiday in Dubai. Ahead of the tournament Queen's announced they were quitting in a controversy over their players being poached by other teams, though Ulster Council President Aogan Farrell had appealed for this practice to stop.

Format

Section A

 Fermanagh v Donegal
 Hogan Stand
 Donegal v Monaghan
 Donegal Now
 Hogan Stand
 Donegal v St Mary's
 Donegal Now
 Hogan Stand
 Independent

Section B

Section C

Later rounds
The semi-finals were contested by Monaghan, Fermanagh, Down and Tyrone. Monaghan defeated Down, while Tyrone defeated Fermanagh.

Tyrone beat Monaghan in the final, held at Armagh's Athletic Grounds on 26 January 2013. Ronan McNally was shown a straight red card on the stroke of half-time.

See also
 2013 O'Byrne Cup

References

Dr McKenna Cup
Dr McKenna Cup
Dr McKenna Cup seasons